Ravenscar was a railway station on the Scarborough & Whitby Railway and served the village of Ravenscar, North Yorkshire, England.

History 
It was renamed Ravenscar on 1 October 1897, after a company had been formed to market the area for investors in property. Up until that point, the area was known as Peak (or Old Peak), but the Scarborough & Whitby Railway Company agreed to change the name of the station to one taken from the name of the local hall (Raven Hall) and the Yorkshire suffix for a cliff, Scar. The planned building boom never materialised and just before the First World War, the company went bankrupt and the scheme was abandoned.

There was also a  tunnel immediately north of the station that curved sharply away to the west. The tunnel was problematic for drivers ascending from Fyling Hall as it was open to the sea and trains often stalled inside it. 

When the Scarborough & Whitby Railway Company failed to have a station house built, as requested by the NER, the latter had the station closed on 2 March 1895, although some excursion trains still stopped there. After a station house was built, the station was reopened on 1 April 1896. Originally there was only a single platform and a siding, but a second platform was added in 1908. Ravenscar was the smallest equipped passing loop on the line, being able to pass trains consisting of 14 wagons, a brake van and the engine.

The 1956 Handbook of Stations listed Ravenscar as being able to handle general goods only, and there was no crane at the yard. The station was host to a LNER camping coach in 1935 and two coaches from 1936 to 1939. Two camping coaches were positioned here by the North Eastern Region from 1954 to 1964 

Freight traffic ended on 4 May 1964 and the station closed completely on 8 March 1965. All buildings except the up platform have been removed since.

References

External links
 Ravenscar station on navigable 1947 O. S. map

Disused railway stations in the Borough of Scarborough
Former North Eastern Railway (UK) stations
Beeching closures in England
Railway stations in Great Britain opened in 1885
Railway stations in Great Britain closed in 1965
1885 establishments in England
1965 disestablishments in England